Trochogyra leptotera is a species of small air-breathing land snail, a terrestrial pulmonate gastropod mollusk in the family Charopidae.

Distribution
This species is found in Argentina, Brazil, Chile, Paraguay, and Uruguay.

References

Trochogyra
Gastropods described in 1882
Taxa named by Jules François Mabille
Taxonomy articles created by Polbot